Xishuangbanna Tropical Botanical Garden (XTBG), of the Chinese Academy of Sciences (CAS), founded in 1959, is located in Mengla County, Xishuangbanna at 21º55' N, 101º15'E, covering an area of 1125 ha. Over 13,000 species of tropical plants are preserved in its 35 living collections, including over 301 families and 2110 genera.

Organization
XTBG is a comprehensive research institution engaged in biodiversity conservation and sustainable uses of plant resources, focusing on forest ecosystem ecology, conservation biology and resource plant development. The institute has three major divisions including two State Key labs (The Keylab for Tropical Forest Ecology (15 research groups), and the Keylab for Tropical Plant resources and Sustainable use(8 groups)), and the Centre for Integrative conservation (9 groups).

It also leads CUBG (the Chinese Union of Botanic gardens: which currently includes 88 Botanic gardens across China) in addition to being an active member of IUBG (the International Union of Botanic Gardens).

Facilities available for scientific research include two national field research stations (Xishuangbanna Tropical Rainforest Ecosystem Station, Ailaoshan Station for Forest Ecosystem Studies and the Yuanjiang Savannna station), and an extension in the Jingdong Subtropical Botanical garden.

Laboratories include Biogeochemistry, Molecular Biology & Biotechnology, Plant Phylogenetics & Conservation Biology, Physiological Ecology; a Germplasm Bank for Rare & Endangered Plants; and a Herbarium and seedbank of Tropical Plants, Landscape ecology, paleobotany, and many others.

Aside from the headquarters in Xishuangbanna, an important division has been set up in Kunming, the capital city of Yunnan Province.

Staff
XTBG has some 338 staff members, including 164 scientific researchers and technical personnel. There are currently 101 senior researchers, 240 postgraduate students (98 of them are doctoral candidates, 142 Masters) and 28 postdoctoral scientists or visiting scientists . XTBG is unusual for a CAS institute in having around 10% of research staff and students from overseas,

Research
XTBG's vision is to be a "Noah's arc for tropical plant conservation", through its ex-situ collections, and to be a leading establishment for tropical biology and conservation research.

Since its establishment, XTBG has accomplished over 698 scientific research projects; 13 important achievements were awarded ministerial or provincial prizes. Since the implementation of Knowledge Innovation Program of the Chinese Academy of Sciences, 17 monographs, 60 books and 829 scientific papers have been published, 91 of them were published on internationally peer-reviewed journals; national patents were awarded to 11 scientific innovations.

Collaboration
International collaborations have been established with botanical gardens, universities, academic research institutions in more than 50 countries and regions and international organizations, and more than 20 agreements on various kinds of cooperative activities have been signed with collaborators. In recent years, XTBG has organized and hosted a series of important international conferences. More than 10 well-known experts and scholars in the world have become XTBG’s honorary professors.

See also

Cai Xitao, botanist
List of botanical gardens
China Biosphere Reserve Network

References

External links
Official website
Kunming Branch of CAS

Research institutes of the Chinese Academy of Sciences
Educational institutions established in 1959
Buildings and structures in Xishuangbanna Dai Autonomous Prefecture
Education in Yunnan
1959 establishments in China
Herbaria in Asia